Rhody may refer to:

 A rhododendron
 James Rhody (fl. 1896–1924), American soccer player
 Rhody (or Little Rhody), a nickname for the U.S. state of Rhode Island
 Rhody the Ram, the mascot for the University of Rhode Island
 Rhody, a nickname for the Washington State Ferry ship MV Rhododendron

See also
 Rhodey, a Marvel Comics character
 Rhodie, a colloquial term for a white Zimbabwean or expatriate Rhodesian
 Roadie (disambiguation)
 Roady (disambiguation)
 Rodi (disambiguation)